Gustav Schönleber (3 December 1851 in Bietigheim – 1 February 1917 in Karlsruhe) was a German landscape painter.

Biography
His father ran a small industrial plant and he received his primary education in Stuttgart. A childhood accident left him blind in one eye. He originally studied mechanical engineering at the University of Stuttgart, but he drew as a hobby and a cousin, who recognized his talent, suggested that he go to Munich to study at the private art school of Adolf Heinrich Lier. He studied landscape painting there from 1870 to 1873.

In the later 1870s, he travelled extensively; to France, Holland and Italy as well as throughout Germany, providing illustrations for numerous books and other publications. From 1880 to 1917, he taught at the Academy of Fine Arts, Karlsruhe, where his notable students included Friedrich Kallmorgen, Wilhelm Hasemann, Paul Müller-Kaempff, Max Wilhelm Roman and Max Frey. By 1888, he was sufficiently well-off to build his own villa next to the Academy.

In 1895 he, Fritz von Uhde and Max Liebermann were chosen to represent Germany at the first Venice Biennale.

He also served on the committee that selected artists to design trading cards for the Stollwerck chocolate company of Cologne, and was a member of the Deutscher Künstlerbund. He was awarded the Pour le Mérite for Sciences and Arts in 1911 and, in 1912, received the Order of the Crown from King William II of Württemberg.

Selected paintings

Bibliography
Art:
 Schönleber, Gustav. 66 Skizzen in Faksimilenachbildungen (Stuttgart: Stuttgarter Kunstverlag, 1925)
 Schönleber, Gustav. Gustav Schönleber 1851–1917: Gemälde – Zeichnungen (Esslingen am Neckar: Stadt Esslingen, 1980)
 Schönleber, Gustav. Gustav Schönleber (Karlsruhe: Städtische Galerie, 1990)
 von Zügel, Heinrich et al. Ausstellung Heinrich von Zügel, 1850–1941, Gustav Schönleber, 1851–1917, Friedrich Eckenfelder, 1861–1938 (Stuttgart: Kunsthaus Bühler, 2002)

Biography, criticism and art history:
 Miller-Gruber, Renate. Gustav Schönleber 1851–1917: Monographie und Werkverzeichnis (R. Miller-Gruber, 1990)
 Mülfarth, Leo. Kleines Lexikon Karlsruher Maler (Karlsruhe, 1987) pp. 99–101
 Schulte-Wülwer, Ulrich. Künstlerkolonie Ekensund am Nordufer der Flensburger Förde (Heide, 2000) pp. 82–85
 "Schönleber, Gustav, Maler" in Badische Biographien, 2 (1987), pp. 251 f.

References

External links

 Landesbibliographie Baden-Württemberg (German)
 Page in Stadtwiki Karlsruhe (German)

1851 births
19th-century German painters
19th-century German male artists
1917 deaths
20th-century German painters
20th-century German male artists
German landscape painters
People from Bietigheim-Bissingen
Recipients of the Pour le Mérite (civil class)
Academic staff of the Academy of Fine Arts, Karlsruhe